Fournier Ridge is an east–west ridge,  long, rising to about  in the western part of the Desko Mountains, on Rothschild Island. It was named by the Advisory Committee on Antarctic Names for Commander James M. Fournier, United States Coast Guard, Commanding Officer, USCGC Burton Island, Operation Deep Freeze, 1976 and 1977, and Executive Officer on the same ship, 1971.

References 

Ridges of Palmer Land